This is the discography of British singer-songwriter Kirsty MacColl.

Albums

Studio albums

Compilation albums

Box sets

Singles

Notes

 "Fairytale of New York" has subsequently reached the UK top 20 every year since 2005, including peaking at number 4 five times (in 2007, and every year 2018-2021) number 5 in 2017, plus number 6 in 2006.

References

Discographies of British artists
Pop music discographies
Rock music discographies
Country music discographies
New wave discographies